Min Jibalina is one of the best-known songs of the Algerian War of Independence (1954–62).

Lyrics

References

Algerian music
Algerian War